Pierre-Édouard Lémontey (14 January 1762, Lyon – 26 June 1826, Paris) was a French lawyer, politician, scholar and historian.

Life 
On the convocation of the États généraux, he was noted for many political writings. Deputy for the Rhône at the Legislative Assembly, he was elected its president several times. He took part in the defence of Lyon against the troops of the National Convention and in 1793 escaped death by fleeing to Switzerland. Lémontey returned in 1795 and was in 1804 made head of the theatrical censorship commission, entering the Académie française in 1819.

He was twice a laureate of the Académie de Marseille for his Éloges praising Peiresc (1785) and those praising Cook (1788). He edited royalist newspapers and was one of the companions at the "Déjeuner de la Fourchette".

Main works 
 Palma, ou le Voyage en Grèce, opéra en deux actes, Paris, Théâtre de la rue Feydeau, 5 fructidor an 6 (1798)
 Raison, folie, chacun son mot, petit cours de morale mis à la portée des vieux enfans (1801)
 Irons-nous à Paris ? ou la famille du Jura (novel written on the occasion of Napoleon I of France's coronation) (1804)
 La Vie du soldat français, en 3 dialogues composés par un conscrit du département de l'Ardèche (1805)
 Thibaut, ou la Naissance d'un comte de Champagne, poème en 4 chants, sans préface et sans notes, traduit de la langue romance, sur l'original composé en 1250, par Robert de Sorbonne, clerc du diocèse de Rheims (1811)
 Essai sur l'établissement monarchique de Louis XIV, et sur les altérations qu'il éprouva pendant la vie de ce Prince (1818) - both praised and controversial on its publication, it was a forerunner of L'Ancien Régime et la Révolution by Tocqueville and underlined the continuity between the institutions of the Ancien Régime and those of the French Revolution. He interpreted this continuity as a result of Louis XIV's absolutism.
 De la Peste de Marseille et de la Provence pendant les années 1720 et 1721 (1821)
 Œuvres, édition revue et préparée par l'auteur (13 vol.) (1829)
 Histoire de la Régence et de la minorité de Louis XV jusqu'au ministère du cardinal de Fleury (1832)

References

External links 
Académie française

1762 births
1826 deaths
Lawyers from Lyon
French opera librettists
19th-century French historians
People of the Bourbon Restoration
People of the First French Empire
Members of the Legislative Assembly (France)
French counter-revolutionaries
Newspaper editors of the French Revolution
French male essayists
French male dramatists and playwrights
18th-century essayists
Writers from Lyon